The Socialist Liberation Party (1920 TKP) is a Marxist–Leninist communist party in Turkey.

The party was founded as "Toplumcu Kurtuluş Partisi" on 7 February 2012. The party changed its name to "Türkiye Komünist Partisi" on 15 February 2012. The Constitutional Court didn't allow the renaming, because there was already a party with same name, i.e. Türkiye Komünist Partisi. Following that, the party started using the name "Toplumcu Kurtuluş Partisi" again and changed the abbreviation from TKP 1920 to 1920 TKP.

Until 2016, the Socialist Liberation Party was one of the components in the United June Movement, a political coalition initiative which was founded after Gezi Park revolt.

References

External links

2012 establishments in Turkey
Communist parties in Turkey
Far-left politics in Turkey
Political parties established in 2012